Eduardo JV Arancillo Kapunan III (born July 23, 1990), known by his stage name JV Kapunan and also known as Young JV, is a Filipino hip-hop recording artist and actor. He became famous for his first single in 2009, "That Girl" which was composed by himself. He produced his first album, Ready or Not under PolyEast Records and Doin' It Big Production. He performs on the variety show ASAP and is a member of an all-male group, A-pop, which is composed of JV himself, Sam Concepcion, Nel Gomez and Jaco Benin. He is a talent of ABS-CBN's Star Magic.

Personal life

JV was the youngest son of retired Col. Eduardo "Red" Kapunan, Jr. (PAF) and Elsa Arancillo Kapunan who also manages his career as an artist. He went to London at Cambridge University where he studied in high school but finished his studies at St. Joseph School in Iloilo. In college, he took up Comm Arts at Entrepreneurs School of Asia (ESA). JV is an active civic leader who helps soldier's families through his Lahing Bayani Foundation, Inc. which was set up for its main objective, to help children of soldiers who perished in the line of duty. In 2010, JV also launched "Ready Or Not: Dance Off", a nationwide multimedia competition in which the winners would form his new dance crew. Batang Mama was announced as the winner and got the chance to appear in his music video for "Can't Get Enough". He also took voice and dance lessons and is currently working on his acting skills.

Career
He first appeared in ASAP 09 in the D-Lite segment where he performed with Nikki Gil, Toni Gonzaga and Karylle.  Weeks after that episode, he had a duet with Sarah Geronimo singing his first single, "That Girl". The song had massive radio airplay. The music video was also premiered on Myx.  The video for "Don't Know You" is directed by Treb Monteras III. His first album highlighted random songs from a night life of partying to inspirational stories based from his dad's experiences as a soldier.

In 2010, he promoted another single, "Shake Shake" which was the official song used for the said competition. The music video was shot in a bar where a party theme was emphasized.

In 2011, "Kaibigan Lang" was the last single released from his first album where they shot the video at ESA (the school where he studied in college) together with Myx VJ 2011 finalist, Cara Eriguel and celebrity appearances from Gabriel Valenciano and Arron Villaflor. In the same year, he released his new single, "Alay" from his second album where he collaborated with Star Power finalist, Akiko Solon. He made his acting debut in the romantic comedy film, Won't Last a Day Without You with Sarah Geronimo and Gerald Anderson as its lead stars. Also, he performed as a support act in the Gravity Tour date in the Philippines by Irish pop vocal band Westlife.

In 2012, he starred in the primetime drama teleserye, Princess and I where he plays Jonas de Ocampo, the guy who courts Dindi, and entangled in a love triangle with his best friend Kiko, played by Khalil Ramos.

On August 29, 2012, Young JV eventually released his second studio album, Doin' It Big under a signed contract with Star Music. The lead single of the album, "Your Name", featuring Myrtle Sarrosa, was eventually chosen as soundtrack for the movie 24/7 in Love. The second single from the album was "Tanong", a midtempo acoustic love song, which also had an accompanying music video. His album featured collaboration with other artists such as Karylle and Yeng Constantino He also made an appearance at Myx Mo! 2013 where he performed "Your Name" with Sarrosa, which received a nomination for Favorite Urban Music Video.

In February 2013, he performed with Zia Quizon, Abra and Bamboo at the opening night of the Himig Handog songwriting contest, held at the SM Mall of Asia Arena. JV tweeted and posted in social media through Twitter and Facebook that a new single will be released entitled, Ngiti (smile) featuring Gary Valenciano on August 25, 2013 that will serve as the lead single (4th over-all) of his repackage album called, Doin' It Big: Platinum Edition.

In 2014, he took part on the third Philippine Popular Music Festival with former South Border lead vocalist Duncan Ramos as the interpreters for the song entry "Hang Out Lang" written by Allan Feliciano and Isaac Garcia.

He released his first single in 2015 entitle, Ale from his third album, YJV, on June distributed worldwide by Star Music. February of the current year, he supported ABS-CBN Lingkod Kapamilya Foundation's eco-tourism and livelihood projects in Samar and Leyte, visited ALKFI's projects and had a concert for the Kapamilyas there.  March – April, he'd been busy supporting Green Thumb Coalition for its Green Thumb Electoral Campaign with its mission of challenging the candidates to include environmental protection on their political agenda. Young JV and his team #YJVteam went all over the Philippines for this.  July to September 2015, Young JV had 23 SM Supermalls Shows, promoting his YJV album.  His second single Flashback feat. Emmanuelle was launched at MOR 91.1 Iloilo, October 2015 and its music video was premiered on MYX the following day and had a Twitter Party with Younglings (Young JV's Official Fans Club).  We saw him December 2015 as "Tony" (Kathryn Bernardo's suitor) on Pangako Sa 'Yo (2015 TV series).

Young JV released his third single Got To Have You February 2016 and its music video is now hitting Pinoy MYX Countdown.  June 2016 onwards, we saw him again on ABS-CBN Primetime Bida, featured on Born For You as "Mix".  August 27, 2016 Young JV launched globally his new single Pasa Diyos featuring The Phenomenal Star Vice Ganda.  This song with its music video is not only proactive in these times but inspirational.  Pasa Diyos is available for download on iTunes, Amazon and Spotify, produced by Doin' It Big Production, distributed digitally worldwide by Star Music.

2017, Star Magic named him as JV KAPUNAN as he will focus more on his acting career.  He was featured on La Luna Sangre as Joshua, the Mole Vampire on SupremoRichard Gutierrez's core vampires.  He'd been also a part of Pusong Ligaw as Jake, one of Enzo Pineda's friends.  But then again at the end of the day, JV still loves composing, producing and performing OPM songs.  As trusted by his Manager and second dad, Mr. Johnny Manahan, JV composed the Star Magic's 25th Anniversary Theme Song, "Ikaw ang Magic ng Buhay Ko".  He also had released his hit digital single,Kulay and was launched on ASAP CHILLOUT on the day of his birthday.  Its music video featuring KissMarc (Kisses Delavin and Marco Gallo) was hitting MYX charts.  As advocate, JV had joined TV Patrol's TPV30 several times.  TPV30 is TV Patrol's way of giving back to our Kapamilya in the whole country, Philippines, in celebration of its 30th Anniversary.  And on the early month of year 2018, something exciting to watch out for will be announced by our dearest environmentalist and philanthropist, Ms. Gina Lopez and JV is part of this advocacy.  Ending the year with a bang!  A kilig interview on Tonight with Boy Abunda with Miho Nishida.

Achievements
2019: ABS-CBN Music's Spotify Wrapped: Most Streamed Track for the month of October 'Bet'
2019: Wave 89.1 Year End Countdown: #86 Ghost
2018: Wave 89.1 Year End Countdown: #88 123 feat. Miho
2018: Music Playlist 101 Sikat 50 OPM Hits: #33 123 feat. Miho
2017: PPop Awards 2017 Rising Pop Male Artist of the Year
2017: MOR 101.9 Pinoy Biga-10 Top 20 OPM Hits of 2017 "Kulay"
2017: Billboard PH's July 2017 Fresh Pick "Kulay"
2009: ASAP 09 Gold Record Awardee for "That Girl"
2009: Wave 89.1 1st Urban Music Awards, Best New Artist of the Year
2009: Monster Radio RX 93.1, Best New Artist of the Year at the Year-End Countdown
2010: Awit Awards, Best Performance by a New Male Recording Artist
2010: MYX Music Awards, Favorite New Artist
2011: Wave 89.1 2nd Urban Music Awards, Best Male Style Icon
2011: Wave 89.1 2nd Urban Music Awards, Best Music Video – "Can't Get Enough"
2011: ASAP Rocks Platinum Circle Awardee for Ready Or Not album
2013: ASAP 18 2Gold Record Awardee for "Doin' It Big" album

Filmography

Television

Film

Discography

Studio albums

References

External links

Filipino rappers
21st-century Filipino male singers
Filipino male models
Male actors from Iloilo
Singers from Iloilo
1990 births
Star Magic
Viva Artists Agency
Living people
PolyEast Records artists
Viva Records (Philippines) artists
Star Music artists
Visayan people